Gary James Kosins (born January 21, 1949) is a former American football running back who played three seasons with the Chicago Bears of the National Football League. He was drafted by the Miami Dolphins in the third round of the 1972 NFL Draft. He played college football at the University of Dayton and attended Chaminade-Julienne High School in Dayton, Ohio.

See also
 List of NCAA major college football yearly scoring leaders

References

External links
Just Sports Stats
College stats

Living people
1949 births
Players of American football from Indiana
American football running backs
African-American players of American football
Dayton Flyers football players
Chicago Bears players
People from Warsaw, Indiana
Players of American football from Dayton, Ohio
21st-century African-American people
20th-century African-American sportspeople